Alexandr Aleksandrovich Predke (born 5 January 1994) is a Russian-born Serbian chess grandmaster (2016).

Biography
Predke started playing chess at the age of seven. He is an alumnus of the Tolyatti chess school. In 2010, he won the Russian Youth Chess Championship in the U16 age group. In 2014, he was third in the Russian Junior Championship in the U20 age group. In 2017, in Samara he was the second in Lev Polugaevsky memorial. In August 2018, he finished third in the Riga Technical University Open "A" tournament.

In 2016, he was awarded the FIDE International Grandmaster (GM) title.

Notes

References

External links
 
 
 
 

1994 births
Living people
People from Dimitrovgrad, Russia
Russian chess players
Chess grandmasters
Naturalized citizens of Serbia
Serbian chess players
Serbian people of Russian descent